Thelma Jones (born 15 June 1932) is a Bermudian sprinter. She competed in the women's 100 metres at the 1952 Summer Olympics.

References

1932 births
Living people
Athletes (track and field) at the 1952 Summer Olympics
Bermudian female sprinters
Bermudian female long jumpers
Olympic athletes of Bermuda
Athletes (track and field) at the 1954 British Empire and Commonwealth Games
Commonwealth Games competitors for Bermuda
Place of birth missing (living people)